B. K. Chaturvedi  is an Indian civil servant. He is former cabinet secretary, Government of India. He was awarded the Padma Bhushan in 2010 for his contribution to the field of civil services. He belongs to 1966 batch of the Indian Administrative Service (IAS).

Early life
B. K. Chaturvedi was born in Uttar Pradesh.  He holds a master's degree in Physics from Allahabad University, with specialization in Electronics. he studied Public Administration from Manchester University, U.K. (1978). He was  member of Planning Commission.

Career
Before joining the IAS, Chaturvedi was a professor of physics at the Motilal Nehru Regional Engineering College, Allahabad.

In 2004, the Prime Minister of India, Manmohan Singh, picked up 1966 batch IAS, Chaturvedi from Allahabad as the top bureaucrat of the country.

He was  a Member, Planning Commission, Government of India. He has been a Member, Thirteenth Finance Commission since November 2007.

References

External links
 Padma awardees

Living people
Recipients of the Padma Bhushan in civil service
Cabinet Secretaries of India
Scientists from Allahabad
Members of the Planning Commission of India
University of Allahabad alumni
20th-century Indian physicists
21st-century Indian physicists
Indian Administrative Service officers
Alumni of the University of Manchester
Year of birth missing (living people)